Sir John MacQueen Ward,  (born 1 August 1940) is a Scottish businessman.

Ward is the son of Marcus Waddie Ward and Catherine MacQueen. He was educated at Edinburgh Academy and Fettes College.

He began a career with IBM at its Greenock Manufacturing Plant in 1966, and in 1991 was appointed Managing Director of UK Government and Public Service Business after working for the company throughout the world. He has subsequently held a wide range of business and public sector jobs, including Chairman of CBI Scotland, Chairman of Scottish Qualifications Authority, Chairman of Quality Scotland Foundation, Chairman of Queen Margaret University's Board of Governors and Chairman of Scottish Homes.

His most recent appointments include the Chairmanship of Scottish Enterprise and of European Assets Trust NV. He was also a Trustee of the National Museums of Scotland between 2005 and 2012 and was Chairman of Dunfermline Building Society between 1995 and 2007.

Ward was appointed a CBE in 1995, the same year he received an Honorary Degree from the University of Strathclyde, and received a Knighthood in the 2002 New Year Honours for Services to Public Life in Scotland.

Ward also received an Honorary Doctorate from Heriot-Watt University in 1998 

In 2004 he appeared at number 10 on The Scotsman's 100 Most Powerful list.

References

External links
 

Living people
1940 births
Scottish businesspeople
People educated at Fettes College
Fellows of the Institution of Engineering and Technology
Fellows of the Royal Society of Edinburgh
Knights Bachelor
Businesspeople awarded knighthoods
Commanders of the Order of the British Empire
People educated at Edinburgh Academy
Businesspeople from Edinburgh